San Pietro in Cerro is a comune (municipality) in the Province of Piacenza in the Italian region Emilia-Romagna, located about  northwest of Bologna and about  east of Piacenza.

San Pietro in Cerro borders the following municipalities: Caorso, Cortemaggiore, Monticelli d'Ongina, Villanova sull'Arda.

Demographic evolution

References

Cities and towns in Emilia-Romagna